Austria competed at the inaugural 7 sports 2018 European Championships from 2 to 12 August 2018. It competed in all sports.

Medallists

Aquatics

Diving

Men

Women

Mixed

Swimming

Men

Women

Mixed

Synchronised swimming

Athletics

Men 
Track and road

Field events

Combined events – Decathlon

Women 
Track and road

Combined events – Heptathlon

Cycling

Road

Men

Women

Track

Elimination race

Madison

Omnium

Points race

Scratch

Golf

Doubles

Foursome

Gymnastics

Men

Team

Women

Team

Rowing

Men

Women

Triathlon

Individual

Relay

External links
 European Championships official site 

2018
Nations at the 2018 European Championships
2018 in Austrian sport